The 2022 IIHF Women's U18 World Championship was the 14th Women's U18 World Championship in ice hockey.

On December 24, 2021, the tournament was cancelled for the second year in a row by the International Ice Hockey Federation (IIHF) due to the COVID-19 pandemic. However, on March 21, 2022, the IIHF announced it had reconsidered and rescheduled the Top Division tournament for June 6–13, 2022 in Madison, Wisconsin, United States.

The venues which hosted the event in Dane County, Wisconsin were LaBahn Arena, located on the campus of the University of Wisconsin in Madison and Bob Suter's Capitol Ice Arena in Middleton, home of the USHL's Madison Capitols.

Top Division

Preliminary round
All times are local (UTC−5).

Group A

Group B

Relegation round
The third and fourth placed team from Group B played a best-of-three series to determine the relegated team.

Final round
Teams were reseeded for the semifinals in accordance with the following ranking:

tier of the group;
position in the group.

Bracket

Quarterfinals

Semifinals

Fifth place game

Bronze medal game

Gold medal game

Final ranking

Awards and statistics

Awards

Best player selected by the Directorate

Source: IIHF

All-Star team

Source: IIHF

Scoring leaders
List shows the top skaters sorted by points, then goals.

GP = Games played; G = Goals; A = Assists; Pts = Points; +/− = Plus/minus; PIM = Penalties in minutes; POS = Position
Source: IIHF

Leading goaltenders
Only the top five goaltenders, based on save percentage, who have played at least 40% of their team's minutes, are included in this list.

TOI = Time on ice (minutes:seconds); SA = Shots against; GA = Goals against; GAA = Goals against average; Sv% = Save percentage; SO = Shutouts
Source: IIHF

Division I

Group A
The tournament would have been held in Győr, Hungary from 9 to 15 January 2022. It was rescheduled and played from 3 to 8 April 2022.

Group B
The tournament would have been held in Radenthein, Austria from 10 to 16 January 2022. It was rescheduled to 6–11 September.

Division II

The tournament would have been held in Istanbul, Turkey from 21 to 27 January 2022. It was rescheduled and played from 27 June to 5 July.

References

External links
Official website of IIHF

IIHF World Women's U18 Championships
2021–22 in women's ice hockey
IIHF
IIHF
International ice hockey competitions hosted by the United States
2022 in ice hockey